Kosivka may refer to:

 Kosivka, Kirovohrad Oblast, a village in Ukraine
 Kosivka, Odessa Oblast, a village in Ukraine
 Kosiv Raion, a raion (district) of Ivano-Frankivsk Oblast, Ukraine
 Kosivska River, Ukraine
 Kosovskoye Lake, Ukraine

See also
 Kosivska Poliana, a village in Zakarpattia Oblast, Ukraine